Lucius Caecilius Metellus may refer to:

 Lucius Caecilius Metellus Denter, consul in 284 BC
 Lucius Caecilius Metellus (consul 251 BC)
 Lucius Caecilius Metellus (tribune 213 BC)
 Lucius Caecilius Metellus Calvus, consul in 142 BC
 Lucius Caecilius Metellus Delmaticus, consul in 119 BC
 Lucius Caecilius Metellus Diadematus, consul in 117 BC
 Lucius Caecilius Metellus (consul 68 BC) (died 68 BC)
 Lucius Caecilius Metellus (tribune 49 BC)